MEGA International is a French software company founded by Lucio de Risi in 1991 in Paris in France as a spin off from Cap Gemini, and is known for the modeling tools, in the domain of Enterprise Architecture and Enterprise Governance Risk and Compliance (software) (GRC).

MEGA International is a member of the Object Management Group (OMG), and participates in their publications, and a member of The Open Group.

References 

Software companies of France